The Bulgaria national under-19 football team is the national under-19 football team of Bulgaria and is controlled by the Bulgarian Football Union. The team competes in the European Under-19 Football Championship, held every year.

Competition results
 Champions   Runners-Up   Semi-Finals   Other Top Results

Balkan Youth Championship

UEFA U-19 European Championship

FIFA U-19 World Championship

Players

Current squad
 The following players were called up for the 2023 UEFA European Under-19 Championship qualification match.
 Match dates: between 21 and 27 September 2022
 Opposition: ,  and 
 Caps and goals correct as of:''' 27 September 2022, after the match against

Recent call ups
The following players have previously been called up to the Bulgaria under-21 squad and remain eligible.

Notes
A = Not part of the current squad due to being called up to the senior team.
INJ = Not part of the current squad due to injury.
COVID = Withdrawn from the current squad due to suffering from COVID-19.

Recent results

Former squads
 1985 FIFA World Youth Championship squads - Bulgaria
 1987 FIFA World Youth Championship squads - Bulgaria
 2008 UEFA European Under-19 Football Championship squads - Bulgaria
 2014 UEFA European Under-19 Football Championship squads - Bulgaria
 2017 UEFA European Under-19 Football Championship squads - Bulgaria

See also
Bulgaria national football team

Bulgaria national under-21 football team

Bulgaria national under-18 football team

Bulgaria national under-17 football team

Notes

External links
Official website 
 Bulgarian football - history, teams, stadiums, fan clubs
 RSSSF archive of results 1924-
 RSSSF archive of most capped players and highest goalscorers
 Planet World Cup archive of results in the World Cup
 Planet World Cup archive of squads in the World Cup
 Planet World Cup archive of results in the World Cup qualifiers

European national under-19 association football teams
Bulgaria national football team
Youth football in Bulgaria